The Quanzhou dialects, also rendered Chin-chew or Choanchew, are a collection of Hokkien dialects spoken in southern Fujian (in southeast China), in the area centered on the city of Quanzhou. Due to migration, various Quanzhou dialects are spoken outside of Quanzhou, notably in Taiwan and many Southeast Asian countries, including Singapore, Malaysia and the Philippines.

Classification
The Quanzhou dialects are classified as Hokkien, a group of Southern Min varieties. In Fujian, the Quanzhou dialects form the northern subgroup of Southern Min. The dialect of urban Quanzhou is one of the oldest dialects of Southern Min, and along with the urban Zhangzhou dialect, it forms the basis for all modern varieties. When compared with other varieties of Hokkien, the urban Quanzhou dialect has an intelligibility of 87.5% with the Amoy dialect and 79.7% with the urban Zhangzhou dialect.

Cultural role
Before the 19th century, the dialect of Quanzhou proper was the representative dialect of Southern Min in Fujian because of Quanzhou's historical and economic prominence, but as Xiamen developed into the political, economic and cultural center of southern Fujian, the Amoy dialect gradually took the place of the Quanzhou dialect as the representative dialect. However, the Quanzhou dialect is still considered to be the standard dialect for Liyuan opera and nanyin music.

Phonology

This section is mostly based on the variety spoken in the urban area of Quanzhou, specifically in Licheng District.

Initials
There are 14 phonemic initials, including the zero initial (not included below):

The inventory of initial consonants in the Quanzhou dialect is identical to the Amoy dialect and almost identical to the Zhangzhou dialect. The Quanzhou dialect is missing the phoneme  found in the Zhangzhou dialect due to a merger of  into . Rev. Carstairs Douglas has already observed the merger in the late 19th century.

Rimes
There are 87 rimes:

The actual pronunciation of the vowel  has a wider opening, approaching .

Tones
For single syllables, there are seven tones:

In addition to these tones, there is also a neutral tone.

Tone sandhi
As with other dialects of Hokkien, the tone sandhi rules are applied to every syllable but the final syllable in an utterance. The following is a summary of the rules:
 The yin level (33) and yang rising (22) tones do not undergo tone sandhi.
 The yang level and entering tones (24) are pronounced as the yang rising tone (22).
 The yin rising tone (554) is pronounced as the yang level tone (24).
 The departing tone (41) depends on the voicing of the initial consonant in Middle Chinese:
 If the Middle Chinese initial consonant is voiceless, it is pronounced as the yin rising tone (554).
 If the Middle Chinese initial consonant is voiced, it is pronounced as the yang rising tone (22).
 The yin entering (5) depends on the final consonant:

Notes

References

External links
 當代泉州音字彙, a dictionary of Quanzhou speech

Hokkien-language dialects
Fujian
Quanzhou